= Florian Volpe =

French footballer (born 1990)

Florian Volpe le brave Cepe
Personal information
- Full name: Florian Volpe
- Date of birth: 19 May 1990 (age 36)
- Place of birth: Sète, France
- Height: 1.74 m (5 ft 9 in)
- Position: Midfielder

Senior career*
| Years | Team | Apps | (Gls) |
| 2008–2009 | Montpellier B | – | (–) |
| 2009–2010 | Sète | – | (–) |
| 2011–2012 | Frontignan | – | (–) |
| 2013–2014 | Magallanes | 4 | (0) |
- * Club domestic league appearances and goals as of 5 April 2020

Florian Volpe (born 19 May 1990) is a French former footballer.

He played for Chilean second-tier side Magallanes, being the first French footballer to play in the history of Chilean professional football.
